Mouzay is a commune in the Meuse department in Grand Est in north-eastern France. It is situated on the right bank of the river Meuse.

Notable people 
 Colette Senghor, French-born First Lady of Senegal (1960 - 1980)

See also 
 Communes of the Meuse department

References

Communes of Meuse (department)